The New Works Programme of 1935–1940 was the major investment programme delivered by the London Passenger Transport Board (LPTB), commonly known as London Transport, which had been created in 1933 to coordinate underground train, tram, trolleybus and bus services in the capital and the surrounding areas. The programme was to develop many aspects of the public transport services run by the LPTB and the suburban rail services of the Great Western Railway (GWR) and London and North Eastern Railway (LNER). The investment was largely backed by government assistance as well as by the issuing of financial bonds and was estimated to cost £42,286,000 in 1936 (approximately £ today).

London Underground
The Programme saw major reconstructions of many central area Underground stations, with escalators being installed to replace lifts; extensions of several tube lines; and connection to and electrification of a number of suburban lines. These included:
Metropolitan line (The majority of projects had been initially planned by the Metropolitan Railway, the owner of the line prior to absorption into the LPTB in 1933.)
installation of colourlight signals on the line between Rickmansworth and Aylesbury and platform extensions for stations on this stretch of the line
Bakerloo line
Northern line (The Northern Heights Plan)
transfer of the Metropolitan line's Great Northern & City (GN&C) branch to Northern line operation
extension from Edgware to 

Central line
 replacement of the line's non-standard track power supply with the Underground's normal fourth rail system
Rolling stock
design and construction of a new fleet of trains, the 1938 stock, to operate on the Central line and Northern line extensions
further conversion of existing locomotive-hauled "Dreadnought" coaches to electric working for the newly electrified Metropolitan Mainline to Aylesbury. Extra "T" stock driving motor coaches had been constructed to allow for this. This scheme was abandoned and later new stock was designed. When rolled out, this was to be the A60 stock
Design and construction of a new fleet of trains for the Hammersmith and City Line, the "O" stock
Provision of similar new trains for the Metropolitan line to Uxbridge, the "P" stock
Conversion of existing hand-worked-door stock to air-door operation and the construction of some new stock for the District line, the "Q" stock programme
Infrastructure
improvements to the power supply system from Lots Road Power Station
improvements to and rebuilding of many busy central area stations including the installation of escalators to replace lifts

Road transport
On the city's roads, the programme was to see the large-scale abandonment of trams and their replacement by trolleybuses, creating the world's largest trolleybus system at that date.

Results and interruption

Before and during World War II
Substantial and rapid progress was made on the network across the capital before the advent of World War II delayed, then prevented its completion. The Central line tunnel relining works were completed in 1938 and the replacement of the line's power supply was completed in 1940. The Bakerloo line service to Stanmore started on 20 November 1939. The 1938 tube stock came into operation as intended although the extensions they were built for were not completed at once.

Underground services to High Barnet commenced on 14 April 1940. Highgate station came into use on 19 January 1941 and services started operating on the branch to Mill Hill East on 18 May 1941. This latter section was finished, exceptionally, to serve Inglis Barracks. The outstanding electrification works on the remainder of the LNER's branch from Finsbury Park to Highgate, from Highgate to Alexandra Palace and from Mill Hill East to Edgware were halted. Works on the extension beyond Edgware were also stopped, although the construction of the new tube depot at Aldenham was completed and the buildings were used to construct Halifax bomber aircraft for the RAF. Other parts of the land purchased for the Bushey Heath extension were farmed during the war to provide food for London Transport canteens.

These were put into service as air-raid shelters (with disastrous results at Bethnal Green) and as underground factories operated by Plessey.

Postwar changes
Initially, plans were put in place to complete the Northern Heights project during 1947 and 1948 and the plans for the extension to Bushey Heath were revised and parliamentary powers were renewed in 1947 for most of the outstanding New Works Programme.

In 1953 the decision was made to cancel this part as well.

The GN&C branch had transferred to the Northern line before the war and remained under its control after the war, but it was never integrated into the rest of the line. The completion of the electrification of the LNER's remaining tracks from Finsbury Park to Alexandra Palace and from Mill Hill East to Edgware was abandoned, and equipment already installed was removed for reuse elsewhere. The bridge, just east of Mill Hill East, was rebuilt with provision for a second track, which was never laid. The Finsbury Park-to-Alexandra Palace section remained with the LNER, and then British Railways, until it was closed in 1954. The Mill Hill-to-Edgware section, which had been closed to passenger traffic, remained in use as a single-track goods line until closed in 1964.

The electrification of the Metropolitan line from Rickmansworth to Amersham and Chesham was not completed until 12 September 1960. and the quadrupling of the tracks was not completed until 1961, but only to a point north of Moor Park. As electrification did not take place all the way north to Aylesbury, the Metropolitan line service north of Amersham was withdrawn in 1961. The Plan to convert locomotive-hauled steam stock to electric working was abandoned, and new EMUs, designed in the 1950s, replaced existing steam and electric locomotives from 1960. They were called the A60 stock.

The scheme to replace trams with trolleybuses was halted shortly after the outbreak of war, with the final conversion taking place on 9 June 1940. The remaining tram routes, mainly in South London, were not finally replaced until 6 July 1952, and then by diesel buses, rather than trolleybuses. The Aldenham site was converted for use as a bus overhaul works for all London Transport buses and opened in 1955.

References

External links
A History of the London Tube Maps, Map from 1939 showing extensions of Northern, Central and Bakerloo lines and a pre-war schedule of estimated dates for the opening of new services
Abandoned Tube stations, Northern Heights
 London Transport Museum Photographic Archive

Rail infrastructure in London
Extensions to the London Underground